Justice, Inc. is a role-playing game designed to simulate the adventure stories in the pulp magazines of the 1930s. 

It was one of the first non-superhero applications of the point-based game system that had been developed for the Champions superhero game.  The generalized point system would eventually be published as the Hero System, following in the footsteps of Chaosium's Basic Role-Playing System, but preceding GURPS as a non-genre-specific game system.

Publishing history
Justice, Inc. was published in July 1984 by Hero Games and was written by Aaron Allston, Steve Peterson and Michael Stackpole. The two-volume set included a rulebook and campaign book containing a discussion of the pulp genre, the "Empire Club" campaign setting, a timeline of real-world events of the 1920s and 1930s, and several pulp adventures.

Two supplements were published: 
 Lands of Mystery (May 1985), a critically acclaimed sourcebook describing how to design and run "Lost World" adventures, like those found in the fiction of Edgar Rice Burroughs and H. Rider Haggard.  
 Trail of the Gold Spike (August 1984), an adventure set around a Colorado gold mine.

Both were written by Allston, and also included statistics for Chill, Call of Cthulhu and Daredevils.

Unlike several other products in the "Hero" line, Justice, Inc. was not revised or republished in the decades after its release. However, Hero Games finally published a Pulp Hero genre book that covers much of the same ground at the end of 2005.

System
Justice, Inc. used a variation on the point-based rules that were then being published in the Champions superhero game.  It placed a heavier emphasis on skills, used lower point totals, and introduced "Talents" rather than "Powers", simulating the paranormal (but not superheroic) abilities of genre characters like the Shadow and Fu Manchu. It used most of the "Disadvantages" of Champions, but halved the points gained from them.

Publications
 Justice Inc. (1984)
 Trail of the Gold Spike (1984), by Aaron Allston
 Lands of Mystery (1985), by Aaron Allston

Reception
In the December 1984 edition of Imagine (Issue 21), Paul Mason stated, "If you like the Champions rules system, and want a campaign set in the era of the pulps, then Justice Inc will be perfect for you. Otherwise I'm afraid I can't recommend it over its competition."

In the January–February 1985 edition of Space Gamer (No. 72), Allen Varney commented, "Justice Inc. is fundamentally solid work, and certainly adaptable to a wide spectrum of pulp-era melodramatics. If your players want lots of variety in one campaign, this is your game! I realize it's a close call, but I'd say that with this publication, Hero Games probably has the strongest roleplaying line on the market."

In the January–February 1985 edition of Different Worlds (Issue #38), Russell Grant Collins gave this game an average rating of 2.5 stars out of 4, saying, "this game is pretty good, although it is marred by a few typos and suffers from incompleteness."

Other reviews
Shadis #28 (1996)

See also
 Justice, Inc. - the pulp magazine story that inspired the game title

References

External links
 Pulp Hero Pulp Hero section on Hero Games' official web site
 Aaron Allston's game credits list
 Hero Pulp Web Site Dany St-Pierre's fan site
 Pulp Review: Justice Inc. by Paolo Marino
 Lands of Mystery Supplement review by Kevin Mowery on RPGnet

Hero System
Historical role-playing games
Role-playing games introduced in 1984
Pulp and noir period role-playing games